The Republic of Ireland women's national under-19 football team represents Ireland at the UEFA Women's Under-19 Championship and the FIFA U-20 Women's World Cup.

History

UEFA Women's Under-19 Championship

The Irish team has qualified for the UEFA Women's Under-19 Championship finals once, reaching the semi-finals in 2014. They lost 4–0 to the Netherlands, for whom Vivianne Miedema scored a hat-trick.

Current squad
The following 20 players were named to the squad to take part in the 2022 UEFA Women's Under-19 Championship qualification section in October 2021.

Head coach: Dave Connell

Coaches
Susan Ronan (2000–2010)
Dave Connell (2017–present)

See also

 Republic of Ireland women's national football team
 Republic of Ireland women's national under-17 football team
 FIFA U-20 Women's World Cup
 UEFA Women's Under-19 Championship

References

Women's national under-19 association football teams
under
European women's national under-19 association football teams